Agti el Ghazi is a fishing village in the Western Sahara.

Location

Agti el Ghazi is on the Atlantic coast in Boujdour Province of the Western Sahara.
It belongs to the Lemseid commune in the Boujdour province of the Laayoune-Sakia El Hamra region.

Origins

The village of Agti el Ghazi was established in 2005 as part of a development program of the Ministry of Agriculture and Fisheries, aimed at establishing fishermen's villages and equipped ports along the Moroccan coast, in order to strengthen the marine fishing sector and revive traditional fishing.
It is one of four fishing villages in the Boujdour province, the others being Lacraa, Aftissat (أفتيسات) and Port Boujdour (مٌناء بوجدور).

Facilities and infrastructure

Avtisat has one fish market, 10 stores for fish trading and 100 stores for sailors, as well as a box store, a gasoline store and an engine repair workshop.
The village has 635 boats for traditional fishing.

Notes

Sources

Populated places in Western Sahara